Mothers and Other Strangers may refer to:

 Mothers and Other Strangers, an episode of The Simpsons
 Mothers and Other Strangers, an episode of Roseanne